Shiryayevo is a rural locality (a village) in Yenangskoye Rural Settlement, Kichmengsko-Gorodetsky District, Vologda Oblast, Russia. The population was 69 as of 2002.

Geography 
Shiryayevo is located 43 km southeast of Kichmengsky Gorodok (the district's administrative centre) by road. Slobodka is the nearest rural locality.

References 

Rural localities in Kichmengsko-Gorodetsky District